Venad was a medieval kingdom lying between the Western Ghat mountains and the Arabian Sea on the south-western tip of India with its headquarters at the port city of Kollam/Quilon. It was one of the major principalities of Kerala, along with kingdoms of Kannur (Kolathunadu), Kozhikode (Nediyiruppu), and Kochi (Perumpadappu) in medieval and early modern period.

Rulers of Venad trace their ancestry to the Vel chieftains related to the Ay lineage of the early historic south India (c. 1st – 4th century CE). Venad – ruled by hereditary "Venad Adikal" – appears as an autonomous chiefdom in the kingdom of the Chera/Perumals of Kodungallur from around 8th – 9th century CE. It came to occupy a position of pre-eminent importance in the structuring of the Perumal kingdom. The country was intermittently and partially subject to the Pandya kingdom in the medieval period.

Venad outlasted the Chera/Perumal kingdom, gradually developed as an independent principality, known as the Chera kingdom, and grew later into modern Travancore (18th century CE). Ravi Varma Kulasekhara, most ambitious ruler of Venad, carried out a successful military expedition to Pandya and Chola lands in the early 14th century CE.

The rulers of Venad, known in the medieval period as Venad Cheras or the Kulasekharas, claimed their ancestry from the Chera/Perumals. Venad ruler Vira Udaya Marthanda Varma (1516–1535) acknowledged the supremacy of the Vijayanagara rulers. Minor battles with Vijayanagara forces in the subsequent period are also recorded. In the 17th century, the rulers of Venad paid an annual tribute to the Nayaks of Madurai. English East India Company established a factory at Vizhinjam in 1664 and a fort was built at Ajengo in 1695.  The medieval feudal relations and political authority were dismantled Marthanda Varma (1729–1758), often credited as "the Maker of Travancore". Travancore became the most dominant state in Kerala by defeating the powerful Zamorin of Kozhikode in the battle of Purakkad in 1755.

Etymology 
The name Venad is believed to be derived from Vēḷ+nāṭu meaning the territory of the Vel chieftains. The earliest preserved Tamil compositions - datable to c. 1st – 4th century CE – attests presence of hill chiefs such as the "Vels" in southern Kerala.

Ruling family 
Medieval Ay kings claimed that they belonged to the Yadava lineage and this claim was advanced by the rulers of Venad and Travancore. As early as the 10th century, the powerful chiefs of Venad used the surname suffix "Varma", denoting the Kshatriya status of the ruling line. Panankavil Palace, whose location remains a mystery, was the royal residence of the Venad rulers at Kollam.

Venad had a kind of chiefly rule with principles of succession, indicated by the term kuru, that is, the rights of the chief and the order of succession within the chief's household. Rulers of the extended Venad royal family lived at different locations in the kingdom. Migrations and setting up new palaces continued into the early modern period. Political authority of a complex nature was followed by the Kerala joint families. Trippappur, Desinganad, Chiravay and Elayadam branches of the family were called "swaroopams". The swaroopams were further divided into matrilineal descent groups (the thavazhis).

Sources refer to the ruler of Venad as controlling parts of Trivandrum district, Kollam and presumably parts of Alleppey and Kottayam districts (and Kanyakumari district in later times). The autonomous chiefdom ("nadu") of Venad came to occupy pre-eminent importance in the structuring of the Chera/Perumal kingdom. The rulers of Venad owed their importance to exchange of spices and other products with the Middle Eastern and Chinese merchants. Venetian adventurer Marco Polo claimed to have visited Venad capital Kollam, a major centre of commerce and trade with East and West Asia. European colonisers arrived at Kollam the late fifteenth century, primarily in pursuit of the Indian spices and textiles.

Political history 
It appears that the whole region of medieval Venad was part of the Ay country in early historic south India (c. 1st – 4th century CE). Veliyans belonging to the Ay family were the hill chiefs of the "Vel country". Towards the close of the early historic period the Pandya supremacy might have extended to Kanyakumari in Ay territory (through it is likely that the Ays retained their lost lands from the Pandyas during the so-called Kalabhra period).

Development of Venad 

The ancient political and cultural history of Venad was almost entirely independent from that of the rest of Kerala. The Chera dynasty governed the area of Malabar Coast between Kanyakumari in the south to Kasaragod in the north. This included Palakkad Gap, Coimbatore, Salem, and Kolli Hills. The region around Coimbatore was ruled by the Cheras during Sangam period between c. 1st and the 4th centuries CE and it served as the eastern entrance to the Palakkad Gap, the principal trade route between the Malabar Coast and Tamil Nadu.

In the middle of the 8th century CE, the Pandya sacked port Vizhinjam, and took possession the Ay Vel country. This foray brought the Chera-Perumal kings of Kodungallur (Makotai) into the conflict and a prolonged Pandya-Ay/Chera struggle followed. By the middle of the 9th century CE, as a result of the encroachment of the Pandyas and Cheras, the ancient Ay country was partitioned into two portions. Venad (Vel+natu = the country of the Vel people) with its base at Kollam came under influence of the Cheras while the Ay country, or what was left of it, came under the influence of the Pandyas.

A new calendar was known as the "Kollam Era", was established in 825 CE at port Kollam. The exact events that lead to the foundation of the era is still matter of scholarly debate. According to historians, it commemorated the foundation of Kollam harbour city after the liberation of Venad from the Pandya rule (and hence beginning of Chera influence). The Kollam Syrian plates (c. 849 CE and c. 883 CE) of Venad chieftain Ayyan Adikal, does mention the then Chera king Sthanu Ravi. The chief was providing land and other provisions to the Christian merchant Mar Sapir Iso at the port of Kollam. The rulers of Venad, known as "Venad Adikal", owed their importance to exchange of spices and other products with the Middle Eastern and Chinese merchants. Sulaiman al-Tajir, a Persian merchant who visited Kerala during the reign of Sthanu Ravi Varma (9th century CE), records that there was extensive trade between Kerala and China at that time, based at the port of Kollam.

The chiefs of Venad were always determined to extend their sway into the Ay territory. There is a possibility that chieftains captured the whole region down to Kottar (Kanyakumari) by 10th century CE.  In general, the influence of the Kerala rulers spread into the ancient Ay territory in the 10th century CE.

The region to the south of present-day Trivandrum – former Ay country – came under the control of the Cholas of Tanjore (under king Raja Raja I) during  early 11th century CE. There is a possibility that the Venad chieftains tried to recapture the old Ay region after the raids by Rajaraja I. Chola prince Rajadhiraja claims to have "confined the undaunted king of Venadu [back] to the Chera kingdom [from the Ay country]...and liberated the [Ay] king of Kupaka" (this event is dated c. 1018-19 CE). Eventually the Chera-Perumal kingdom also submitted to the Chola rule (early 11th century CE).

Cherar ruler Rama Kulasekhara, a contemporary of Chola Kulothunga (1070 -1120 CE), is seen organising the defence against the Cholas at Kollam in early 12th century CE.

Venad in late medieval period 

The prosecution of the Pandya-Chola wars necessitated long residence of Chera/Perumal king of Kodungallur Rama Kulasekhara at Kollam. There is a tradition that Vira Kerala, a ruler of Kollam in early 12th century, was a son of the last Chera king. 
After the dissolution of the Chera/Perumal kingdom (c. 12th century), Venad survived, and emerged as a powerful principality in southern India, as result of the wars of conquest and well as the Indian Ocean spice trade. Venad, now known as the kingdom of the Cheras or the Kulasekharas, was intermittently subject to the Pandyas during this period. Possibly with the decline of Chola power after Kulothunga, Venad Cheras gradually extended their control over the present Kanyakumari district. In the early 14th century, "Sangramadhira" Ravi Varma carried out military raids to northern edges of south India (1312–1316). His inscriptions can be found as north as Poonamallee, a suburb of Chennai.

In Venad royal family, like most of other royal houses in Kerala, law of succession followed was based on matrilineal inheritance. The eldest son of the sister of the ruling king, not his own son, had the legal right to ascend the throne after the death of the king.

The port at Kozhikode held superior economic and political position in medieval Kerala coast, while Kannur, Kollam, and Kochi, were commercially important secondary ports, where the traders from various parts of the world would gather.

Aditya Varma (1376–83) seems to have resisted some "Muslim invaders" on the borders of Venad. His successor Chera Udaya Marthanda Varma (1383–1444) is credited for the extent of the rule of Venad into interior Tirunelveli region. Vira Udaya Marthanda Varma (1516–1535) acknowledged the supremacy of the Vijayanagara rulers. Minor battles with Vijayanagara forces in the subsequent period are also recorded.

The Portuguese arrived at Kappad Kozhikode in 1498 during the Age of Discovery, thus opening a direct sea route from Europe to India. They were the first Europeans to establish a trading center in Tangasseri, Kollam in 1502, which became the centre of their trade in pepper. It was the beginning of Portuguese era in Venad.

Well into the modern period, Venad remained one of the chief monarchies of Kerala, along with Kingdoms of Kannur (Kolathunadu), Kozhikode (Zamorin) and Kochi (Perumpadappu). Padmanabhaswamy Temple in Trivandrum was the major temple in the region. In the 17th century, the rulers of Venad paid an annual tribute to the Nayaks of Madurai. By this time, the old state of Venad was divided into several autonomous collateral branches such as Trippappoor, Elayadathu, (Kottarakara), Desinganad (Kallada, Kollam), and Peraka Thavazhi (Nedumangad).

During the "regency" of Umayamma (1677–1864), southern Venad was famously overrun by a Muslim adventurer. English East India Company established a factory at Vizhinjam in 1664 and a fort was built at Ajengo in 1695. Around 150 Company men from the Anjengo Factory, proceeding for an audience with the queen-mother, were lynched by a mob in "the Attingal Outbreak" of 1721. Ravi Varma, ruling from 1721 to 1729, entered into formal agreements with the Company and the Nayaks of Madurai. The primary objective of the submission was to strengthen the position of the king against the regional nobles (such as "the Ettuvittil Pillamar") and other "hostile elements" in Venad.

Rise of Travancore 
In the early 18th century CE, the Travancore royal family adopted some members from the royal family of Kolathunadu based at Kannur, and Parappanad based in present-day Malappuram district. Marthanda Varma (1729–1758), of the Trippappoor, is often hailed by historians as "the Maker of Travancore". Travancore became the most dominant state in Kerala by defeating the powerful Zamorin of Kozhikode in the battle of Purakkad in 1755.  Marthanda Varma – at the end of whose rule Travancore was one of the first modern states of south India – is usually credited with the following "achievements".

 Successfully developed the centralised state of Travancore (from Tiruvitamkur/Tiruvitamcode). Dismantling of existing feudal relations.
 Routed all of major Nair nobles and other "hostile elements" in Travancore.
 Organised a standing army, and defeated most of the chiefdoms in central Kerala.
 Entered into strategic alliances with Europeans.
 Supported Kerala merchants (Syrian Christian) in the place of the Europeans.

Rulers of Venad (till 16th century)

Early historic

 Veliyan Venmal Nallini – the wife of the Chera chieftain Utiyan.
 Veliyan Venman Ay Eyinan – the leader of the Chera warriors against Nannan of Ezhimalai.

Early medieval 
Vel Mannan of Vizhinjam (latter half of the 8th century CE) – Seen in Madras Museum Inscription of Maran Chadaiyan
 Venattadikal the Nayanar – author of Venattadikal Thiruvichaippa (early 9th century AD)

Under Chera Perumal influence 
 Ayyan Adikal Tiru Adikal – Donor of Quilon Syrian copper plates (mid-9th century CE)
Rama Tiru Adikal – Junior chief of Venad (mid-9th century CE)
 Kandiyur Vel Kula Sundara – a warrior in the Chola army under Vellan Kumaran (c. 949 CE)
 Sri Vallava Goda Varma – Donor of Mamapalli copper plates (c. 973 CE)
 Govardhana Marthanda – Successor of Srivallavan Goda Varma (c. 976 – 1000 CE)
Seen in Jewish copper plates of Cochin (c. 1000 CE)
 Kumara Udaya Varma – mentioned in the inscription by Chera Perumal king Rama Kulasekhara (c. 1102 CE)
 Vira Kerala – son of Rama Kulasekhara (c. 1126, Cholapuram)

From 12th century onwards

Venad Dynasty
Kotha Varma Martanda (1102–1125)
 Vira Kerala Varma I (1125–1145)
 Kodai Kerala Varma  (1145–1150)
 Vira Ravi Varma (1161–1164)
 Vira Kerala Varma II  (1164–1167)
 Vira Aditya Varma (1167–1173)
 Vira Udaya Martanda Varma (1173–1192)
 Devadaram Vira Kerala Varma III (1192–1195)
 Vira Manikantha Rama Varma Tiruvadi (1195– ?)
 Vira Rama Kerala Varma Tiruvadi (1209–1214)
 Vira Ravi Kerala Varma Tiruvadi (1214–1240)
 Vira Padmanabha Martanda Varma Tiruvadi (1240–1252)
 Jayasimha Deva (1266–1267
 Ravi Varma (1299–1313)
 Vira Udaya Martanda Varma (1313–1333)
 Aditya Varma Tiruvadi (1333–1335)
 Vira Rama Udaya Martanda Varma Tiruvadi (1335–1342)
 Vira Kerala Varma Tiruvadi (1342–1363)
 Vira Martanda Varma III (1363–1366)
 Vira Rama Martanda Varma (1366–1382)
 Vira Ravi Varma (1383–1416)
 Vira Ravi Ravi Varma (1416–1417)
 Vira Kerala Martanda Varma (1383)
 Chera Udaya Martanda Varma (1383–1444)
 Vira Ravi Varma, (1444–1458)
 Sankhara Sri Vira Rama Martanda Varma (1458–1468)
 Vira Kodai Sri Aditya Varma (1468–1484)
Vira Ravi Ravi Varma (1484–1503)
 Martanda Varma, Kulasekhara Perumal (1503–1504)
 Vira Ravi Kerala Varma, Kulasekhara Perumal (1504–1528)

See also

 Travancore Royal Family
Battle of Manacaud
Kingdom of Calicut
Kingdom of Cannanore
Kingdom of Cochin

References
 Travancore Archaeological Series, Vol. I – VII. Triandrum (Kerala): Government Press (Travancore). 1910–38. 
Elamkulam Kunjan Pillai. Some Problems in Kerala History (Chila Kerala Charithra Prasnangal (Part I, II, & III)). Kerala Cultural and Historical Research Library.

Further reading
State and Society in Premodern South India, eds R. Champakalakshmi, Kesavan Veluthat, and T. R. Venugopalan. Thrissur, CosmoBooks, 2012.
Noburu Karashima (ed.), A Concise History of South India: Issues and Interpretations. New Delhi: Oxford University Press, 2014
Ganesh, K. N. Agrarian Relations and Political Authority in Medieval Travancore (A. D. 1300–1750). Doctoral Thesis. Jawaharlal Nehru University, 1987.
Ganesh, K.N. (1990-02). "The Process of State Formation in Travancore". Studies in History. 6 (1).
Ganesh, K.N. (2009-06). "Historical Geography of Natu in South India with Special Reference to Kerala". Indian Historical Review. 36 (1): 3–21. 
Veluthat, Kesavan, The Political Structure of Early Medieval South India, (New Delhi, Orient Longman, 1993; second revised edition, New Delhi, Orient Blackswan, 2012)
Narayanan, M. G. S. Perumaḷs of Kerala: Brahmin Oligarchy and Ritual Monarchy: Political and Social Conditions of Kerala Under the Cera Perumaḷs of Makotai (c. AD 800 – AD 1124). Thrissur (Kerala): CosmoBooks, 2013.
Elamkulam Kunjan Pillai. Some Problems in Kerala History (Chila Kerala Charithra Prasnangal (Part I, II, & III)). Kerala Cultural and Historical Research Library.
Mailaparambil, Binu John. Lords of the Sea: The Ali Rajs of Cannanore and the Political Economy of Malabar (1663–1723). Leiden: Brill: Leiden, 2012
Cherian, P. J., editor. Perspectives on Kerala History – The Second Millennium. Trivandrum (Kerala): Kerala Gazetteers Department, 1999.

History of Kollam
Kingdoms of Kerala
Feudal states of Kerala